Zaneylan-e Olya (also Romanized as Zaneylān-e ‘Olyā; also known as Zeynalān-e ‘Olyā) is a village in Jalalvand Rural District, Firuzabad District, Kermanshah County, Kermanshah Province, Iran. At the 2006 census, its population was 181, in 40 families.

References 

Populated places in Kermanshah County